The following outline is provided as an overview of and topical guide to the U.S. state of Kansas:

Kansas – U.S. state located in the Midwestern United States. It is named after the Kansas River which flows through it, which in turn was named after the Kansa Native American tribe, which inhabited the area. The tribe's name (natively kką:ze) is often said to mean "people of the wind" or "people of the south wind," although this was probably not the term's original meaning.

General reference 

 Names
 Common name: Kansas
 Pronunciation: 
 Official name: State of Kansas
 Abbreviations and name codes
 Postal symbol:  KS
 ISO 3166-2 code:  US-KS
 Internet second-level domain:  .ks.us
 Nicknames
 America's Bread Basket
 Sunflower State
 Wheat State (previously used on license plates)
 Adjectival: Kansas
 Demonym: Kansan

Geography of Kansas 

Geography of Kansas
 Kansas is: a U.S. state, a federal state of the United States of America
 Location
 Northern hemisphere
 Western hemisphere
 Americas
 North America
 Anglo America
 Northern America
 United States of America
 Contiguous United States
 Central United States
 West North Central States
 Midwestern United States
 Great plains
 Population of Kansas: 2,853,118 (2010 U.S. Census)
 Area of Kansas:
 Atlas of Kansas

Places in Kansas 
 Historic places in Kansas
 Ghost towns in Kansas
 National Historic Landmarks in Kansas
 National Register of Historic Places listings in Kansas
 Bridges on the National Register of Historic Places in Kansas
 National Natural Landmarks in Kansas
 National parks in Kansas
 State parks in Kansas

Environment of Kansas 
 Climate of Kansas
 Geology of Kansas
 Superfund sites in Kansas
 Wildlife of Kansas
 Fauna of Kansas
 Ants of Kansas
 Birds of Kansas
 Reptiles
 Snakes of Kansas

Natural geographic features of Kansas 
 Rivers of Kansas
 Big Basin Prairie Preserve

Regions of Kansas

Administrative divisions of Kansas 
 The 105 counties of the state of Kansas
 Municipalities in Kansas
 Cities in Kansas
 State capital of Kansas:
 City nicknames in Kansas

Demography of Kansas 

Demographics of Kansas

Government and politics of Kansas 

 Form of government: U.S. state government
 United States congressional delegations from Kansas
 Kansas State Capitol
 Elections in Kansas
 Political party strength in Kansas

Branches of the government of Kansas 

Government of Kansas

Executive branch of the government of Kansas 
Governor of Kansas
Lieutenant Governor of Kansas
 Secretary of State of Kansas
 Kansas State Treasurer
 State departments
 Kansas Department of Transportation

Legislative branch of the government of Kansas 
 Kansas Legislature (bicameral)
 Upper house: Kansas Senate
 Lower house: Kansas House of Representatives

Judicial branch of the government of Kansas 

Courts of Kansas
 Supreme Court of Kansas

Law and order in Kansas 

Law of Kansas
 Cannabis in Kansas
 Crime in Kansas
 Law enforcement in Kansas
 Law enforcement agencies in Kansas

Laws by type 
 Alcohol laws of Kansas
 Capital punishment in Kansas
 Individuals executed in Kansas
 Constitution of Kansas
 Gun laws in Kansas

Military in Kansas 
 Kansas Air National Guard
 Kansas Army National Guard

History of Kansas 
 History of Kansas

History of Kansas, by period 

 Prehistory of Kansas
 French colony of Louisiane, 1699–1764
 Treaty of Fontainebleau of 1762
 Spanish (though predominantly Francophone) district of Alta Luisiana, 1764–1803
 Third Treaty of San Ildefonso of 1800
 French district of Haute-Louisiane, 1803
 Louisiana Purchase of 1803
 Unorganized U.S. territory created by the Louisiana Purchase, 1803–1804
 Lewis and Clark Expedition, 1804–1806
 District of Louisiana, 1804–1805
 Territory of Louisiana, 1805–1812
 Pike Expedition, 1806–1807
 Territory of Missouri, 1812–1821
 War of 1812, June 18, 1812 – March 23, 1815
 Treaty of Ghent, December 24, 1814
 Adams-Onís Treaty of 1819
 Unorganized Territory, 1821–1854
 Santa Fe Trail, 1821–1880
 Mexican–American War, April 25, 1846 – February 2, 1848
 Treaty of Guadalupe Hidalgo, February 2, 1848
 Treaty of Fort Laramie of 1851
 Territory of Kansas, 1854–1861
 Kansas–Nebraska Act of 1854
 History of slavery in Kansas
 Bleeding Kansas, 1854–1859
 Pike's Peak Gold Rush, 1858–1861
 Territory of Jefferson (extralegal), 1859–1861
 Pony Express, 1860–1861
 State of Kansas becomes 34th State admitted to the United States of America on January 29, 1861
 American Civil War, April 12, 1861 – May 13, 1865
 Kansas in the American Civil War
 Price's Raid, September 27 – December 2, 1864
 Comanche Campaign, 1868–1874
 Spanish–American War, April 25 – August 12, 1898
 Dwight D. Eisenhower becomes 34th President of the United States on January 20, 1953
 United States Supreme Court hands down decision in Brown v. Board of Education of Topeka on May 17, 1954

History of Kansas, by region 
 By city
 History of Kansas City

History of Kansas, by subject 
 History of education in Kansas
 History of slavery in Kansas
 History of sports in Kansas
 History of the Kansas City Royals (a professional sports team located in Missouri but often affiliated with Kansas)
 Timeline of college football in Kansas

Culture of Kansas 
Culture of Kansas
 Museums in Kansas
 Religion in Kansas
 Episcopal Diocese of Kansas
 Scouting in Kansas
 State symbols of Kansas
 Flag of the State of Kansas 
 Great Seal of the State of Kansas

The Arts in Kansas 
 Music of Kansas

Sports in Kansas 

Sports in Kansas
 College athletic programs in Kansas
 Kansas State High School Activities Association
 Kansas Sports Hall of Fame

Economy and infrastructure of Kansas 

Economy of Kansas
 Communications in Kansas
 Newspapers in Kansas
 Radio stations in Kansas
 Television stations in Kansas
 Energy in Kansas
 List of power stations in Kansas
 Solar power in Kansas
 Wind power in Kansas
 Health care in Kansas
 Hospitals in Kansas
 Transportation in Kansas
 Airports in Kansas

Education in Kansas 

Education in Kansas
 Schools in Kansas
 School districts in Kansas
 High schools in Kansas
 Colleges and universities in Kansas
 University of Kansas
 Kansas State University

See also 

 Topic overview:
 Kansas

 Index of Kansas-related articles

References

External links 

 Access documents, photographs, and other primary sources on Kansas Memory, the Kansas State Historical Society's digital portal

Kansas
Kansas